The 2021–22 Basketball Champions League was the 6th season of the Basketball Champions League (BCL), the premier European professional basketball competition for clubs launched by FIBA. The season began on 5 October 2021 and ended on 15 May 2022, featuring 16 domestic champion teams. 

The defending champions, San Pablo Burgos, were eliminated in the play-ins. The winners of the Champions League will qualify for the 2023 FIBA Intercontinental Cup. The Bilbao Arena in Bilbao hosted the Final Four, which marked the first time the arena of a non-participating team is chosen as a host.

Lenovo Tenerife won its second-ever Champions League title (its last being in 2017) after defeating Baxi Manresa in the final.

Team allocation 
A total of 52 teams from 30 countries participated in the 2021–22 Basketball Champions League.

Teams 
League positions after eventual playoffs of the previous season shown in parentheses (TH: Champions League title holders, WC: Wild card).

Referees
A total of 55 officials set to work on the 2021–22 season in Basketball Champions League:

Schedule 
The schedule of the competition will be as follows.

Qualifying rounds

Draw
The 24 teams will be divided into six pots based firstly on the competition's club ranking and, for clubs that have not yet participated in the competition, on the country ranking. For the quarterfinals round of qualifications, teams from Pot 6 will be drawn against teams from Pot 3, and teams from Pot 4 will face teams from Pot 5. Clubs from Pot 1 and 2 will be seeded, and will enter directly in the semifinals stage of qualifications and will face the winners from the quarterfinals round. The winners of the semifinals stage will face each other in the finals of qualifications. The four winners of the finals will then qualify for the regular season and join the 28 directly qualified teams in the main draw. The rest of the teams will be demoted, if they apply, to the FIBA Europe Cup.

Notes

 Indicates teams with no club points, therefor using the country points as a tiebreaker.

Qualification Group A (Athens, Greece)

Qualification Group B (Treviso, Italy)

Qualification Group C (Tallinn, Estonia)

Qualification Group D (Sofia, Bulgaria)

Regular season

Draw
The 28 teams that entered in the regular season directly were divided into four pots based firstly on the club ranking and, for clubs that have not yet participated in the competition, on the country ranking. The country protection rule will apply for the stage of the draw. Clubs cannot be drawn in groups with other clubs from the same country.

Notes

 Indicates teams with no club points, therefor using the country points as a tiebreaker.

Group A

Group B

Group C

Group D

Group E

Group F

Group G

Group H

Play-ins
The Play-ins took place from January 4 to 19. The teams classified in second and third place in their respective groups of Basketball Champions League, will go on to the Play-ins. Winners will advance to the round of 16. The first legs were played on 4–5 January, the second legs on 11–12 January. Third legs were played on 18–19 January.

|}

Round of 16 
The Round of 16 took place from January 25 until March 23, 2022. The groups were formed by the winners of each Regular Season Group and by eight Play-Ins winners. The 16 teams were divided in 4 groups, 4 teams each. The first two of each groups advanced to the quarter-finals.

Group I

Group J

Group K

Group L

Playoffs

The playoffs began on April 5, 2022 and ended with the 2022 Basketball Champions League Final Four.

Final Four

Semifinals
The semifinals were played on 6 May 2022.

|}

Third place game
The third place game was played on 8 May 2022.

|}

Final
The final was played on 8 May 2022.

|}

Individual awards

Season awards
The annual season awards were announced on 6 May.

Star Lineup

MVP of the Month

Attendances to arenas

Average attendances

Qualification rounds

See also 
2021–22 EuroLeague
2021–22 EuroCup Basketball
2021–22 FIBA Europe Cup

References

External links 
Official website

 
 
Basketball Champions League